Sir John Peyton, 1st Baronet (1561 – December 1616) was an English politician who sat in the House of Commons  at various times between 1593 and 1611.

Biography
Peyton was the eldest surviving son of Robert Peyton of Isleham and his wife, Elizabeth Rich, daughter of Richard Rich, 1st Baron Rich of Rochford Hall and Leigh's Priory, Essex. He was a Justice of the Peace (J.P.) for the Isle of Ely from about 1584. He succeeded to the family estates on the death of his father in 1590. From about 1591, he was a JP for Cambridgeshire. 

In 1593, he was elected Member of Parliament for Cambridgeshire. He was High Sheriff of Cambridgeshire and Huntingdonshire from 1593 to 1594. He became Deputy Lieutenant in 1596  and was knighted on 1 November 1596. In 1604, he was elected again as MP for Cambridgeshire. He was created baronet on 22 May 1611.

Peyton died at the age of 56 and was buried at Isleham on 19 December 1616.

Family
Peyton married Alice Osborne, daughter of Sir Edward Osborne, Lord Mayor of London, of St. Dionis Backchurch, London in 1580 and had six sons and five daughters. He was succeeded in the baronetcy by his son Edward. Their daughter, Frances Peyton, was mother of Sir John Hobart, 3rd Baronet.

References

1561 births
1616 deaths
High Sheriffs of Cambridgeshire and Huntingdonshire
Baronets in the Baronetage of England
English MPs 1593
English MPs 1604–1611
English justices of the peace
People from Isleham